Audubon Wildlife Theatre was a wildlife documentary series that ran starting in 1968.

Season 1: 1968 

39 episodes

Season 2: 1971 

A 12-week series

Season 3: 1972

References

External links
 TVarchive.ca Episode Guide - Audubon Wildlife Theatre

Audubon